

Active players

All time

This is a list of Canadians, who have played at least one regular season game in the National Football League.

See also 
 List of Canadians in NASCAR
 List of Canadians in the National Basketball Association
 List of Major League Baseball players from Canada

External links
Pro Football Reference - Players born in Canada

National Football League